Llano Bonito is a district of the León Cortés Castro canton, in the San José province of Costa Rica.

Geography 
Llano Bonito has an area of  km² and an elevation of  metres.

Locations 
 Poblados (villages): Bajo Mora, Bajo Venegas (part), Concepción, San Francisco, San Luis, San Rafael Abajo, Santa Juana, Santa Rosa (part)

Demographics 

For the 2011 census, Llano Bonito had a population of  inhabitants.

Transportation

Road transportation 
The district is covered by the following road routes:
 National Route 313

References 

Districts of San José Province
Populated places in San José Province